Bus is a nickname, notable users of which include:

 Bus Griffiths (1913-2006), cartoonist, lumberjack, and fisherman
 Bus Mertes (1921–2002), American football player and coach
 Bus Whitehead (1928–2010), American basketball player
 Bus Wilbert (1915-1946), American racecar driver
 Bus Cook, National Football League sports agent
 Harry "Bus" Yourell (1919–2011), American politician

See also
 The Bus (disambiguation)
 Bus (surname)

Lists of people by nickname